Love Songs is a 2004 compilation album by Santana.

Track listing
 "Samba Pa Ti"
 "Europa (Earth's Cry Heaven's Smile)"
 "Give Me Love"
 "I'll Be Waiting" (Single version)
 "Flor D'luna (Moonflower)"
 "Stormy"
 "Life Is a Lady/Holiday"
 "Aqua Marine" (Single version)
 "Sensitive Kind"
 "I Love You Much Too Much"
 "One with You"
 "Daughter of the Night"
 "Written in Sand"
 "Before We Go"
 "Love Is You"

References

2004 compilation albums
Santana (band) compilation albums